Alexander Arkadyevich Migdal (born 22 July 1945) is a Russian-American physicist and entrepreneur, formerly at Landau Institute for Theoretical Physics, Space Research Institute, Princeton University, ViewPoint Corp, Magic Works LLC, and now at Migdal Research LLC.

Scientific career 

Alexander Migdal made important contributions to the theory of critical phenomena, quantum chromodynamics and conformal field theory. As an undergraduate student he worked out (with Alexander Polyakov) the theory of the dynamical mass generation in gauge theories, commonly
referred to as the "Higgs mechanism", in the spring of 1965,
independently

of Robert Brout, François Englert and Peter Higgs.

In 1968 he published a paper (with Vladimir Gribov) which introduced (in the context of the Reggeon field theory) scale invariance with anomalous dimensions to be determined as eigenvalues of bootstrap equations of quantum field theory. This work led to so called Migdal-Polyakov conformal bootstrap which had profound influence and helped to make progress in the theory of critical phenomena as well as the theory of strong interactions.

In the next decade Migdal made important progress in quantum chromodynamics by introducing a novel form of the renormalization group (now called Migdal-Kadanoff bond-moving approximation), and by deriving (with Yu. Makeenko) the equation for the Wilson loops. The so-called Migdal program was a precursor and provided an impetus to the Shifman-Vainshtein-Zakharov sum rule method  (SVZ sum rules) in QCD
which presently plays a basic role in the calculations of hadronic properties. Later he found exact solution of quantum gravity in two dimensions (with V. Kazakov and D. Gross), starting the topic of matrix models of topological field theories which occupied the physics community for a number of years.

He also worked on the applications of quantum field theory to the theory of turbulence, and derived the exact loop equation for velocity circulation to describe this phenomenon. He initiated (with V. Gurarie, G. Falkovich, and V. Lebedev) a description of intermittency in nonlinear systems by means of Instanton solutions of the stochastic differential equations.

After a hiatus in his research work, he restarted publishing prolifically in 2019, on various aspects of turbulence. In these years he was affiliated with the Fresnel Research Lab LLC, New York University as a Research Professor, and the Abu Dhabi Investment Authority.

Entrepreneurship

Leaving Princeton tenure in 1996, he became an inventor and entrepreneur. He holds 10+ patents in laser scanning and 3D data compression/transmission, built (with A. Lebedev and M. Petrov) first textured 3D scanner which was awarded as Best Of What's New and other industrial awards. He was director of several companies and invited speaker of numerous international conferences. Currently he is CEO of his fourth start-up company Migdal Research LLC dedicated to the stock market prediction.

Selected books, poems and essays 

A. A. Migdal, "Loop Equations and 1/N Expansion"
A. A. Migdal, "English Prose"
A. A. Migdal, "Russian Prose"
A. A. Migdal, "Russian Poems"
A. A. Migdal, "Statistical Equilibrium of Circulating Fluids"

See also
Banks–Zaks fixed point
Superfluidity

References

External links 
 http://alexandermigdal.com

1945 births
Living people
Jewish physicists
American people of Russian-Jewish descent
Moscow Institute of Physics and Technology alumni
Jewish American scientists
21st-century American Jews